The Gottbegnadeten-Liste ("God-gifted list" or "Important Artist Exempt List") was a 36-page list of artists considered crucial to Nazi culture.  The list was assembled in September 1944 by Joseph Goebbels, the head of the Ministry of Public Enlightenment and Propaganda, and Germany's supreme leader Adolf Hitler.

History
The list exempted the designated artists from military mobilisation during the final stages of World War II.  Each listed artist received a letter from the Nazi Propaganda Ministry which certified his or her status. A total of 1,041 names of artists, architects, music conductors, singers, writers and filmmakers appeared on the list.  Of that number, 24 were named as especially indispensable; they thus became the equivalent of National Socialism's "national treasures".

Goebbels included about 640 motion picture actors, writers and directors on an extended version of the list. They were to be protected as part of his propaganda film efforts, which persisted through the end of the war (and culminating in the expensive final UFA production Kolberg, released in January 1945).

Many of the cultural figures appearing on the list are no longer widely remembered but there are exceptions, including a number of renowned classical musicians such as the composers Richard Strauss, Hans Pfitzner, and Carl Orff, the orchestral conductors Wilhelm Furtwängler and Herbert von Karajan, and the Wagnerian baritone Rudolf Bockelmann.  The only foreigner (Ausländer) on the list was Dutch actor Johannes Heesters.

Special listed artists

Architects
 architect Leonhard Gall (1884–1952), "Reichskultursenator"
 architect Hermann Giesler (1898–1987), "Reichskultursenator"
 architect Wilhelm Kreis (1873–1955)
 architect and critic Paul Schultze-Naumburg (1869–1949)

Visual artists

 sculptor Arno Breker (1900–1991), named as "Reichskultursenator" (Reich Culture Senator)
 sculptor Fritz Klimsch (1870–1960) 
 sculptor Georg Kolbe (1877–1947) 
 sculptor Josef Thorak (1889–1952)
 history painter Arthur Kampf (1864–1950)
 painter Werner Peiner (1897–1984)

Authors
 Gerhart Hauptmann (1862–1946)
 Hans Carossa (1878–1956)
 Hanns Johst (1890–1979), "Reichskultursenator"
 Erwin Guido Kolbenheyer (1878–1962)
 Agnes Miegel (1879–1964)
 Ina Seidel (1885–1974)

Musicians

 Richard Strauss (1864–1949)
 Hans Pfitzner (1869–1949)
 Wilhelm Furtwängler (1886–1954) (removed on December 7, 1944 because of his relationships with German resistance.)

Actors
 Otto Falckenberg (1873–1947)
 Gustaf Gründgens (1899–1963)
 Johannes Heesters (1903–2011)
 Friedrich Kayßler (1874–1945) 
 Eugen Klöpfer (1886–1950)
 Hermine Körner (1878–1960)
 Heinz Rühmann (1902–1994)
 Heinrich Schroth (1871–1945)

Singers
 Rudolf Bockelmann (1892–1958)
 Josef Greindl (1912–1993)
 Heinrich Schlusnus (1888–1952)
 Wilhelm Strienz (1899–1987)

Further listed artists on the "Führerliste" 
There was also an extended list, the so-called "Führerliste" that included "God-gifted artists" who were not to be drafted but worked as "Künstler im Kriegseinsatz" (artists in the war effort).

Authors

 Hans Friedrich Blunck (1888–1961)
 Friedrich Griese (1890–1975)
 Josef Weinheber (1892–1945)
 Gustav Frenssen (1863–1945)
 Hans Grimm (1875–1959) 
 Max Halbe (1865–1944) 
 Heinrich Lilienfein (1879–1952) 
 Börries Freiherr von Münchhausen (1874–1945) 
 Wilhelm Schäfer (1868–1952) 
 Helene Voigt-Diederichs (1875–1961)

Composers

 Johann Nepomuk David (1895–1977)
 Werner Egk (1901–1983)
  (1906–1984)
 Harald Genzmer (1909–2007) 
 Ottmar Gerster (1897–1969)
 Kurt Hessenberg (1908–1994)
 Paul Höffer (1895–1949) 
 Karl Höller (1907–1987) 
 Mark Lothar (1902–1985)
 Joseph Marx (1882–1964) 
  (1914–1993)
 Carl Orff (1895–1982)
 Ernst Pepping (1901–1981)
 Max Trapp (1887–1971)
 Fried Walter (1907–1996)
 Hermann Zilcher (1881–1948)

Conductors

 Hermann Abendroth (1883–1956)
 Karl Elmendorff (1891–1962) 
 Robert Heger (1886–1978) 
 Oswald Kabasta (1896–1946) 
 Herbert von Karajan (1908–1989)
 Johannes Schüler (1894–1966) 
 Karl Böhm (1894–1981) 
 Eugen Jochum (1902–1987) 
 Hans Knappertsbusch (1888–1965) 
 Joseph Keilberth (1908–1968) 
 Rudolf Krasselt (1879–1954) 
 Clemens Krauss (1893–1954) 
 Hans Schmidt-Isserstedt (1900–1973)
 Carl Schuricht (1880–1967)

Instrumentalists

 Ludwig Hoelscher (1907–1996), cellist 
 Elly Ney (1882–1968), pianist
 Walter Morse Rummel (1887–1953), pianist
 Günther Ramin (1898–1956), organist and choirmaster
 Walter Gieseking (1895–1956), pianist
 Wilhelm Stross (1907–1966), violinist
 Gerhard Taschner (1922–1976), violinist

Theater and opera

 Raoul Aslan (1886–1958), director and actor
 Heinrich George (1893–1946), actor 
 Werner Krauß (1884–1959), actor 
 Karl-Heinz Stroux (1908–1985), actor and director 
 Heinrich Schlusnus (1888–1952), singer
 Wilhelm Strienz (1899–1987), singer
 Paula Wessely (1907–2000), actress

Fine Arts

 Claus Bergen (1885–1964), marine painter
 Ludwig Dettmann (1865–1944), war painter (member of the Berlin Secession)
 Fritz Mackensen (1866–1953), painter
 Franz Stassen (1869–1949), painter
 Clemens Klotz (1886–1969), architect
 Alfred Mahlau (1894–1967), painter
 Ernst Neufert (1900–1986), architect
 Bruno Paul (1874–1968), architect
 Richard Scheibe (1879–1964), sculptor
 Joseph Wackerle (1880–1959), sculptor

Special film-list initiated by Goebbels

 Wolf Albach-Retty (1908–1967)
 Willy Fritsch (1901–1973)
 Attila Hörbiger (1896–1987)
 Viktor de Kowa (1904–1973)
 Harry Piel (1892–1963)
 Hans Albers (1891–1960) 
 Karl Dannemann (1896–1945)
 O. W. Fischer (1915–2004) 
 Hans Holt (1909–2001) 
 Paul Hörbiger (1894–1981) 
 Ferdinand Marian (1902–1946)
 Armin Schweizer (1892–1968)
 Hermann Thimig (1890–1982)

See also
 Reserved occupation

References

Maximilian Haas: Die Gottbegnadeten-Liste (BArch R 55/20252a) in: Juri Giannini, Maximilian Haas und Erwin Strouhal (Hrsg.): Eine Institution zwischen Repräsentation und Macht. Die Universität für Musik und darstellende Kunst Wien im Kulturleben des Nationalsozialismus. Mille Tre Verlag, Vienna 2014, pp. 239–276. .
 

1944 documents
Nazi culture